Yardley Wood railway station serves the Yardley Wood area of Birmingham in the West Midlands of England. Located on the North Warwickshire Line, the station, and all trains serving it, are operated by West Midlands Trains.

The station platforms are accessed by ramps from Highfield Road, which crosses over the railway on a bridge just north of the station. The ticket office is located at road level, adjacent to the bridge.

History

The station was opened by the Great Western Railway (GWR) on 1 July 1908, along with the line, and was originally known as Yardley Wood Platform.... Platform being a GWR term for a station which was intermediate between a halt and a station in importance and facilities; the suffix was later dropped. Unlike the previous and following stations on the line ( and ) Yardley Wood was never provided with goods facilities. Most of the original station buildings are still intact.

The station staff houses for the Station Master and Sub-Station Master, built on Highfield Road by GWR in 1907, were in use until around the late 1970s but were sold off as private houses shortly after this time. They still stand next to the station on Highfield Road

Services
During Monday to Saturday daytimes:

 3 trains per hour northbound to Birmingham Moor Street and Birmingham Snow Hill continuing to Stourbridge Junction, with some trains continuing onward to Kidderminster and Worcester.  

On Sundays, there is an hourly train between Worcester, Birmingham, Shirley and Stratford-upon-Avon.

References

External links

Rail Around Birmingham and the West Midlands: Yardley Wood station
Warwickshire Railways: Yardley Wood station

Railway stations in Birmingham, West Midlands
DfT Category E stations
Former Great Western Railway stations
Railway stations in Great Britain opened in 1908
Railway stations served by West Midlands Trains
1908 establishments in England
Yardley Wood